James Healy Seamount (former names Healy Seamount, Healy Volcano) is a submarine volcano located among the South Kermadec Ridge Seamounts south of New Zealand's Kermadec Islands. The flanks of the volcano are covered with pumice and volcanic rocks, and hydrothermal venting occurs inside the caldera.

The caldera appears to have formed in one large explosive eruption that may have generated a pumice raft. Parts of the "Loisels Pumice" in New Zealand are suspected to have originated in this eruption, which took place 590±80 years before present (1950). Healy is also suspected to be the source of a tsunami that impacted Maori communities during the 15th century, and may be a continuing tsunami hazard.

Geography and geology

Regional 

The seafloor northeast of New Zealand is dominated by four structures, from east to west these are the Kermadec Trench, the Kermadec Ridge, the Havre Trough and the Colville Ridge. This gives rise to an island arc-backarc system with subduction in the Kermadec Trench and spreading in the Havre Trough; the latter separates the Kermadec Microplate from the Australia Plate. Volcanism has moved southeastward during the last five million years, eventually ending up on the current front by 770,000 years ago and producing a bimodal suite of rocks: Mostly basalt, but also dacite and rhyolite, in particular during recent eruptions.

They have erupted rocks like basalt and andesite as lava flows, pillow lavas and pyroclastic flows as well as their breccia and hyaloclastite counterparts. Seven volcanoes are hydrothermally active and two, Brothers volcano and Healy, feature silicic calderas. Healy is part of a northwest-trending chain of volcanoes, which includes Giljanes, Yokosuka and Rapuhia.

Local 

Healy volcano, which is also known as James Healy Seamount and named after the geologist James Healy, lies northeast of New Zealand and is wholly submerged. Small cones are found on the southeastern caldera floor.

The surface of the volcano consists of felsic rock outcrops, lapilli and pyroclastic breccia. About  of the volcano is covered with pumice, most of the flanks are covered with muddy and winnowed sands, pyroclastics and rarely outcrops. The caldera flanks and floor are covered mainly by lapilli and boulders. There is widespread evidence for ocean current-driven erosion of bottom sediments both on the slopes of the volcano and in its caldera.

Composition

Most of the pumice is white, but about one fifth is grey and one twentieth yellow-grey. The fragments have sizes of  but occasionally exceed  and they have a mostly even texture, although some show a wood-like deformed texture. The vesicles are mostly spherical when small and become longer, more complex and interconnected at larger sizes. Some pumices have pink colours, indicating that they were exposed to air while hot. Mafic blebs have been extracted from the pumices. Healy volcano may feature ore deposits and has been considered a target for mineral prospecting.

Healy is dominantly formed by rhyodacitic rocks but basalt also occurs, the rocks define a low-potassium suite. Healy pumices contain rare phenocrysts of amphibole, apatite, iron-titanium oxide and pyroxene. Despite their distinct textures, the various pumice groups have a similar composition. Basaltic rocks have been recovered from the caldera. The formation of silicic magmas in oceanic volcanic arcs has been interpreted either as a consequence of fractional crystallization processes or the remelting of crustal materials; processes which yield similar magma compositions and are thus difficult to distinguish, although an origin through fractional crystallization is possible at Healy. The development of felsic magma and calderas at Healy and some other Kermadec volcanoes appears to be a consequence of a thicker crust which facilitates crustal melting.

Eruption history 

Evidence from dredged samples indicates that the Healy caldera formed through one or several catastrophic eruptions. Some rocks may have formed during lava dome-forming eruptions. While improbable, the Healy caldera may actually be an explosion crater. Data from hydrophones indicate that an eruption took place either at Brothers Seamount or at Healy in 2015.

590 BP eruption

The eruption that gave rise to the Healy pumice may have occurred 590 ± 80 years before present. It has been reconstructed to have been a high-volume pyroclastic eruption, which generated an underwater eruption column that did not strongly interact with the surrounding seawater and only featured a minor phreatomagmatic component. Part of the eruption column could have risen to the surface, possibly creating a pumice raft that would have been transported to New Zealand by oceanic currents and eddies.

The 590 ± 80 eruption may have triggered a tsunami impacting New Zealand. In northeast New Zealand, tsunami deposits at Henderson Bay, Whangapoua Bay, Waihi Beach, Ohiwa Harbour (both Bay of Plenty) and Tāwharanui Peninsula may be linked to the Healy caldera-forming eruption although the link is not definitive. There is evidence that a tsunami in the 15th century impacted the Maori populations, triggering a shift of settlements from coastal areas to hills; this tsunami may have originated from Healy caldera or correlate to a 1420 tsunami in Japan. Other prehistoric tsunamis in New Zealand may have been caused by activity or collapses of Healy volcano or of other volcanoes in the Kermadec arc.

Loisels Pumice

Sea-rafted pumices are common in New Zealand. A common pumice formation found in northern New Zealand and the Chatham Islands  farther east was identified in 1962 and named the "Loisels Pumice" after the beach where it was identified. This pumice has a scientific importance stemming from its age, which directly post-dates the arrival of Maori people on New Zealand and can be used to correlate coastal sites. Pumices that may be part of the Loisels Pumice have been found as far as Fraser Island in Australia although this identification is debatable.

The composition and finding places of Loisels Pumice strongly imply that it was the product of volcanic eruptions in the Tonga-Kermadec arc rather than of volcanism on the New Zealand landmass. While it was originally assumed that it stemmed from a single eruptive event, chemical and chronological considerations imply that it is the product of multiple volcanic events. One set of Loisels Pumice has an appearance and composition similar to the Healy pumices and probably originated there; they might have been transported on to land by tsunamis. Alternatively, the Loisels Pumice may have been formed by an earlier, pre-caldera eruption of Healy.

Hydrothermal activity

Hydrothermal venting occurs on the southern floor of Healy Caldera and produces metal-rich discharges and iron oxide mounds. There is no evidence for hydrothermal activity at Cotton, and unlike all other Kermadec arc volcanoes there are no known chemosynthetic animal communities at Healy.

The hydrothermal activity gives rise to a particular plume above the volcano and to numerous submarine plumes mostly linked to the caldera and its walls. Together with the Brothers volcano, Healy is one of the two most hydrothermally active volcanoes of the southern Kermadec arc. If the southern Kermadec arc is representative of hydrothermal emissions from volcanic arcs elsewhere in the world, such emissions may constitute a significant part of the global hydrothermal budget.

Hazards

A tsunami-generating eruption of Healy has been considered in disaster modelling scenarios of cities in northern New Zealand. A Krakatau-like eruption at Healy could result in a tsunami comparable to that resulting from an earthquake in the Kermadec trench with maximum wave heights of several metres in the Bay of Plenty and elsewhere along northeastern New Zealand. However, the present-day risk for a repeat of such an event is low.

See also
 List of volcanoes in New Zealand

Notes

References

Sources

External links 

 Healy volcano at Te Ara – the Encyclopedia of New Zealand

Submarine volcanoes
Calderas of New Zealand
Seamounts of New Zealand
Zealandia
Geography of the Kermadec Islands
Volcanoes of New Zealand